Houstry is a scattered crofting village, in the east coast of Dunbeath, Caithness, Scottish Highlands and is in the Scottish council area of Highland.A large wind farm has been built next to the village.

Notable people
The Scottish inventor Alexander Bain was born in Houstry.

References

Populated places in Caithness